Qasim Mohammad Jalal al-Araji Hussaini is an Iraqi politician, former head of the Iraqi Interior Ministry, and a senior member of the Badr Organization.

History

Education and Iran–Iraq War
He was born around 1963 in Kut, southern Iraq. He studied accounting at the Ayatollah Motahhari University in Iran, and Islamic studies at the Imam Kadhim Institute.

His official biography claims he moved to Iran shortly after the 1979 Iranian Revolution, but it is believed he was actually a soldier in the Iraqi army in 1984 and fought in the Iran–Iraq War. He was captured by Iran and pledged allegiance to the government, joining the pro-Iranian Badr Organisation. He received military training in camps of the Islamic Revolutionary Guard Corps. He fought against Iraq for the remainder of the war, later carrying out intelligence work against the government of Saddam Hussein.

Return to Iraq

After years of exile in Iran, he returned to Iraq after the 2003 invasion of Iraq by the United States. On April 19, 2003, he was arrested by the U.S. on suspicion of commanding militia forces. He was held for 85 days and then released on insufficient evidence.

In 2007, he was again detained by U.S. forces and held in Camp Bucca for 23 months. A secret cable from the U.S. Embassy in Baghdad, dated January 19, 2007 and published by WikiLeaks, stated that U.S. forces "had good information based on multiple sources," that al-Araji was "involved in smuggling and distribution" of explosives that were being used to target U.S. forces and that he was "also suspected in involvement in an assassination cell." He was again released for lack of evidence.

In the 2014 Iraqi parliamentary election, he was elected as a member of parliament for the Wasit Province. He was also appointed as a member of the Security & Defense Commission and head of the Badr bloc in the parliament.

Between 2014 and 2015, he repeatedly claimed the United States was supporting the Islamic State of Iraq and the Levant, saying, "The U.S. has supported ISIS in Syria and funded the group in Iraq," adding that, "The duality of America is very clear in terms of fighting ISIS, The U.S. government supports the Kurdistan region in battling ISIS, but refuses to stand with the Iraqi security forces or the tribesmen in battling the group."

He was approved by Parliament as the head of the Iraqi Interior Ministry on Jan 30, 2017. He replaced Mohammed Al-Ghabban who had resigned. Upon taking office he ousted 30,000 people whose "behavior was not conducive to a professional security force."  Al-Araji showed willingness to work with both the United States and Sunnis. He appointed Sunnis to key positions in the Ministry and stated that Iraq continues to need American help. Following the 2018 Iraqi parliamentary election, Prime Minister Adil Abdul-Mahdi succeeded al-Araji as head of the ministry on an interim basis.

Personal life
He is married and has four children.

References

Badr Brigade members
Members of the Council of Representatives of Iraq
Islamic Supreme Council of Iraq politicians
Government ministers of Iraq
Prisoners and detainees of the United States military
1964 births
Living people
Anti-Americanism